"Goth Census" is an EP written and recorded by German electro-industrial musician Wumpscut.

Track listing
 "My Dear Ghoul" - 3:24
 "We Believe, We Believe" - 3:37
 "Udanai, My Lord (Yendri Club Mix)" - 4:35
 "You Are a Goth (Yendri Lift-Your-Mask Remix)" - 4:44
 "You Are a Goth (Yendri Club Remix)" - 4:11

References

2007 EPs
Wumpscut albums